Sir George Herbert Andrew, KCMG, CB (19 March 1910 – 18 August 1985) was an English civil servant. Educated at Corpus Christi College, Oxford, he entered the Patent Office in 1931, moving to the Board of Trade in 1938, where he became second secretary in 1955 and was heavily involved in negotiations to enter the Common Market in 1961–63. He moved to the Ministry of Education in 1963 as a deputy secretary; later that year, he was appointed Permanent Secretary. In 1964, the Ministry became the Department for Education and Science and he remained Permanent Secretary, jointly initially and then alone until he retired in 1970. In retirement, was ordained a priest in the Church of England and served in several curacies in Yorkshire.

References 

1910 births
1985 deaths
English civil servants
Alumni of Corpus Christi College, Oxford
Knights Commander of the Order of St Michael and St George
Companions of the Order of the Bath